A Uniform Resource Locator (URL), colloquially termed as a web address, is a reference to a web resource that specifies its location on a computer network and a mechanism for retrieving it. A URL is a specific type of Uniform Resource Identifier (URI), although many people use the two terms interchangeably. URLs occur most commonly to reference web pages (HTTP) but are also used for file transfer (FTP), email (mailto), database access (JDBC), and many other applications.

Most web browsers display the URL of a web page above the page in an address bar. A typical URL could have the form http://www.example.com/index.html, which indicates a protocol (http), a hostname (www.example.com), and a file name (index.html).

History

The format combines the pre-existing system of domain names (created in 1985) with file path syntax, where slashes are used to separate directory and filenames. Conventions already existed where server names could be prefixed to complete file paths, preceded by a double slash (//).

Berners-Lee later expressed regret at the use of dots to separate the parts of the domain name within URIs, wishing he had used slashes throughout, and also said that, given the colon following the first component of a URI, the two slashes before the domain name were unnecessary.

An early (1993) draft of the HTML Specification referred to "Universal" Resource Locators. This was dropped some time between June 1994 and October 1994 (draft-ietf-uri-url-08.txt).

Syntax

Every HTTP URL conforms to the syntax of a generic URI. 

A web browser will usually dereference a URL by performing an HTTP request to the specified host, by default on port number 80. URLs using the https scheme require that requests and responses be made over a secure connection to the website.

Internationalized URL
Internet users are distributed throughout the world using a wide variety of languages and alphabets, and expect to be able to create URLs in their own local alphabets. An Internationalized Resource Identifier (IRI) is a form of URL that includes Unicode characters.  All modern browsers support IRIs. The parts of the URL requiring special treatment for different alphabets are the domain name and path.

The domain name in the IRI is known as an Internationalized Domain Name (IDN). Web and Internet software automatically convert the domain name into punycode usable by the Domain Name System; for example, the Chinese URL http://例子.卷筒纸 becomes http://xn--fsqu00a.xn--3lr804guic/. The xn-- indicates that the character was not originally ASCII.

The URL path name can also be specified by the user in the local writing system. If not already encoded, it is converted to UTF-8, and any characters not part of the basic URL character set are escaped as hexadecimal using percent-encoding; for example, the Japanese URL  http://example.com/引き割り.html becomes http://example.com/%E5%BC%95%E3%81%8D%E5%89%B2%E3%82%8A.html. The target computer decodes the address and displays the page.

Protocol-relative URLs

Protocol-relative links (PRL), also known as protocol-relative URLs (PRURL), are URLs that have no protocol specified. For example, //example.com will use the protocol of the current page, typically HTTP or HTTPS.

See also

 Hyperlink
 PURL – Persistent URL
 CURIE (Compact URI)
 URI fragment
 Internet resource locator (IRL)
 Internationalized Resource Identifier (IRI)
 Clean URL
 Typosquatting
 Uniform Resource Identifier
 URI normalization
 Use of slashes in networking

Notes

Citations

References

External links
 URL specification at WHATWG

 
Identifiers
Computer-related introductions in 1994